Ebenezer Shamo Abbey (born 28 April 1980) is a Ghanaian former professional footballer who played as a forward.

Career
Abbey was born in Accra. He played in Ghana for Real Tamale United, Okwahu United, Asante Kotoko, in Germany FC St. Pauli and in Mali for Stade Malien. In Vietnam for Dong A Bank, Song Lam Nghe An, Bình Dương, Khatoco Khánh Hoà and Viettel FC.

References

External links

1980 births
Living people
Ghanaian footballers
Association football forwards
Stade Malien players
Asante Kotoko S.C. players
Real Tamale United players
FC St. Pauli players
Okwawu United players
Accra Hearts of Oak S.C. players
Ghanaian expatriate footballers
Ghanaian expatriate sportspeople in Vietnam
Expatriate footballers in Vietnam
Expatriate footballers in Mali
Ghanaian expatriate sportspeople in Germany
Expatriate footballers in Germany